Lately is the studio album by the Contemporary Christian and gospel singer Raymond Cilliers. It was released on the label Brettian Productions in 2005.

Track listing

Single
"Lady Love" (A videoclip was made for this song)

References 

2005 albums
Raymond Cilliers albums